The 2021 Rice Owls baseball team represented Rice University in the sport of baseball for the 2021 college baseball season. The Owls competed in Division I of the National Collegiate Athletic Association (NCAA) and in Conference USA West Division. They played their home games at Reckling Park in Houston, Texas. The team was coached by Matt Bragga, who was in his third season with the Owls.

For the first time since joining Conference USA in 2005, Rice did not qualify for this season's conference tournament. The Owl's broke their 14-year appearance in the tournament. On May 24, 2021, Rice announced that coach Bragga was relieved from his coaching duties.

Preseason

C-USA media poll
The Conference USA preseason poll was released on February 11, 2021 with the Owls predicted to finish in third place in the West Division.

Preseason All-CUSA team
Braden Comeaux – Infielder

Schedule and results

Schedule Source:
*Rankings are based on the team's current ranking in the D1Baseball poll.

References

External links
•	Rice Baseball

Rice
Rice Owls baseball seasons
Rice Owls baseball